Besigheim is a municipality in the district of Ludwigsburg in Baden-Württemberg in southern Germany.

It is situated 13 km north of Ludwigsburg at the confluence of the Neckar and Enz rivers. The town has many old buildings and a town hall that dates back to 1459. There are two medieval towers, Gothic church, cobblestone market place and other historical objects of interest.

History
Besigheim was founded in the 12th century as a well-defended walled city. The first mention of the city in official documentation was in 1153 in a decree by King Friedrich I.

In 1693, the fortifications were all but destroyed by French troops, and by 1750 were little more than rubble.

International relations

Besigheim is twinned with:
Ay, France
Newton Abbot, England
Bátaszék, Hungary

Notable people
Friedrich Schrempf (1858–1912), editor and member of the German Reichstag
Christoph Schrempf (1860–1944), theologian and philosopher
Werner Villinger (1887–1961), child and youth psychiatrist

References

External links

Official Web site

12th-century establishments in the Holy Roman Empire
Ludwigsburg (district)
Populated places on the Neckar basin
Populated riverside places in Germany
Populated places established in the 12th century
Württemberg